Jan Shutan Levinson (born Janice Dottenheim; November 5, 1932 – October 7, 2021) was an American actress, best known for her appearance in Star Trek: The Original Series, Sons and Daughters and The Andy Griffith Show.

Life 
Shutan was born in Los Angeles, California, and grew up in Beverly Hills. She was a winner on the TV program Arthur Godfrey's Talent Scouts.

She appeared in TV roles on Ben Casey (as Joanie Shutan/Joanie Cramer) (1963–1966), Bonnie in Room 222 (1969–1970) and Ruth Cramer in Sons and Daughters (1974). She also appeared in  The Outer Limits (1964), The Fugitive (1965), FBI (1965), as "cousin" Gloria in The Andy Griffith Show (1965), and as Lt. Mira Romaine in the Star Trek: The Original Series episode The Lights of Zetar (1969).

Shutan supplemented her acting on TV programs by making commercials, beginning with one for Tareyton cigarettes. She went on to do commercials, sometimes more than 20 in a year, for "everything from cars to soapsuds."

Films she appeared in include Man in the Square Suit (1966), The Seven Minutes (1971), Message to My Daughter (1973), Love Is Not Forever (1974), Dracula's Dog (1978), and This House Possessed (1981).

Shutan died in Beverly Hills, California on October 7, 2021, at the age of 88.

Career Credits

References

External links 
 

1932 births
2021 deaths
20th-century American actresses
Actresses from Los Angeles
American film actresses
American television actresses
21st-century American women
Burials at Mount Sinai Memorial Park Cemetery